Tennessee State University (Tennessee State, Tenn State, or TSU) is a public historically black land-grant university in Nashville, Tennessee, United States. Founded in 1912, it is the only state-funded historically black university in Tennessee. It is a member-school of the Thurgood Marshall College Fund. Tennessee State University offers 41 bachelor’s degrees, 23 master's degrees, and eight doctoral degrees. It is classified as "R2: Doctoral Universities – High research activity".

History
The university was established as the Tennessee Agricultural & Industrial State Normal School for Negroes in 1912. Its dedication was held on January 16, 1913. It changed its name to Tennessee Agricultural & Industrial State Normal College in 1925. Two years later, in 1927, it became known as Tennessee Agricultural & Industrial State College.

In 1941, the Tennessee General Assembly directed the Board of Education to upgrade the educational program of the college.  Three years later the first master's degrees were awarded and by 1946 the college was fully accredited the Southern Association of Colleges and Schools.

Significant expansion occurred during the presidency of Walter S. Davis between 1943 and 1968, including the construction of "70 percent of the school's facilities" and the establishment of the graduate school and four other schools.

In 1968, the college officially changed its name to Tennessee State University, and in 1979, the University of Tennessee at Nashville merged into Tennessee State due to a court mandate.

In 2022, Tennessee State University was awarded a historic $250 million from the state legislature as reparations for decades of discriminatory state funding compared to fellow public Tennessee institutions of higher education.  The funds will be used to upgrade facilities and academic programs on campus. Tennessee State's $250 million investment is the largest single investment into a historically black institution in the history of the country.

Today, Tennessee State University is divided into eight schools and colleges and has seen steady growth since its inception. It remains the only public university in Nashville and its health science program is the largest in the state and one of the largest in the nation.

Aligned with the Tennessee Board of Regents, it is currently governed by an institutional board of trustees.

Campus
The  main campus has more than 65 buildings, and is located in a residential setting at 3500 John A. Merritt Blvd in Nashville, Tennessee. Tennessee State's main campus has the most acres of any college campus in Nashville. The Avon Williams campus is located downtown, near the center of the Nashville business and government district. Tennessee State offers on-campus housing to students. There are on-campus dorms and two apartment complexes for upperclassmen. On-campus facilities include dormitories Wilson Hall, Watson Hall, Eppse Hall, Boyd Hall, Rudolph Hall, Hale Hall, as well as the Ford Complex and New Residence Complex, TSU's two on-campus apartment complexes.

Academics

The university is currently accredited by the Commission on Colleges of the Southern Association of Colleges and Schools (SACS) to award 38
baccalaureate degrees, 24 master's degrees, and doctoral degrees in seven areas (Biological Sciences, Computer Information Systems Engineering, Psychology, Public Administration, Curriculum and Instruction, Educational Administration and Supervision, and Physical Therapy), as well as two Associate of Science degree  programs, one in nursing and one in dental hygiene.

Tennessee State is classified as "R2: Doctoral Universities – High research activity."

The university is organized into the following colleges:

College of Agriculture, Human, and Natural Sciences
College of Business
College of Education
College of Engineering
College of Health Sciences
College of Liberal Arts
College of Life and Physical Sciences
College of Public Service

The University Honors College (UHC) is an exclusive academic program founded in 1964 that caters to select academically talented and highly motivated undergraduate students.

The College of Business is accredited by the Association to Advance Collegiate Schools of Business (AACSB). It was the first institution in Nashville to earn the accreditation of both its undergraduate and graduate business programs in 1994. The Psychology program is accredited by the American Psychological Association and the Teacher Education program by the National Council for Accreditation of Teacher Education (NCATE).

The College of Engineering has developed corporate partnerships with NASA, Raytheon, and General Motors and is accredited by the Accreditation Board for Engineering and Technology (ABET) and the National Association of Industrial Technology (NAIT).

The College of Health Sciences (formerly the School of Allied Health) includes such programs as the Masters in Physical Therapy and the Bachelor of Health Sciences. The Master of Public Health program was accredited in 2015 by the Council on Education for Public Health (CEPH).

Student activities

Athletics

Tennessee State University sponsors seven men's and eight women's teams in National Collegiate Athletic Association (NCAA) sanctioned sports. The school competes in the NCAA's Division I Football Championship Subdivision and is a member of the Ohio Valley Conference (OVC). As a member of the OVC, Tennessee State is one of three Division I HBCU athletic programs that are not members of either the Mid-Eastern Athletic Conference (MEAC) or Southwestern Athletic Conference (SWAC), whose members are primarily HBCU institutions.

Student organizations
There are over 60 registered student organizations on campus.

NPHC fraternities
 Alpha Phi Alpha - Beta Omicron chapter
 Kappa Alpha Psi - Alpha Theta chapter
 Omega Psi Phi - Rho Psi chapter
 Phi Beta Sigma - Zeta Alpha chapter
 Iota Phi Theta - Delta Beta chapter

NPHC sororities
 Alpha Kappa Alpha - Alpha Psi chapter
 Delta Sigma Theta - Alpha Chi chapter
 Zeta Phi Beta - Epsilon Alpha chapter
 Sigma Gamma Rho - Alpha Beta chapter

Other fraternities and sororities
 Alpha Phi Omega - Psi Phi chapter
 Gamma Sigma Sigma - Epsilon Psi chapter
 Phi Mu Alpha Sinfonia - Eta Xi chapter
 Epsilon Gamma Iota - Delta chapter
 Sigma Alpha Iota - Kappa Iota chapter
 Alpha Kappa Psi - Chi Psi chapter
Kappa Kappa Psi - Zeta Pi chapter
Tau Beta Sigma - Zeta Pi chapter

Honor societies
 Phi Kappa Phi National Honor Society
 Alpha Kappa Mu
 Golden Key International Honour Society
 Phi Eta Sigma

Student Government Association (SGA)
 Mister & Miss TSU and The Royal Court
 House of Representatives
 Student Election Commission
 Student Union Board of Governors

Other notables
Aristocrat of Bands (marching band)
The Sophisticated Ladies (marching band danceline) 
TSU Cheerleaders (co-ed)
Collegiate 100 Black Men of Middle Tennessee
National Association of Colored Women's Club
Allure Modeling Troupe
New Direction Gospel Choir
University Honors Council
Speech, Debate, & Acting Team
HIP'Notyze Dance Troupe
The Meter (student newspaper)

Notable alumni

Aviation
{{alum/start
|ilist=
|alist=
{{Alum|name=U. L. "Rip" Gooch|year=|nota=Commercial pilot (20,000+ hours); certified flight instructor; owner/president, Aero Services, Inc.; 1993 Kansas Governor's Aviation Honor Award; inductee, Black Aviation Hall of Fame|ref=<ref name="salina">"Salina bankers deny claim they discriminate against minorities,", "Salina Journal, June 6, 1971,  page 8, (retrieved Oct.29, 2014 from "Newspapers.com"); includes TEXT identifying "U.L. "Rip" Gooch, president of Aero Services Co., Wichita," as one of the speakers.</ref>Campbell, Jim, ed., "Who Is Rip Gooch And Why Do We Owe Him? 80-Year Old Aviation Pioneer Feted In Wichita,"Aero-News Network online, Sep 15, 2003}}
}}

Civil rights

Education

Entertainment 

Politics

Science and technology

Sports

See also

 List of Tennessee State University presidents
 Southern Heritage Classic
 From the RoughReferences

Further reading
 Lovett, Bobby L. A Touch of Greatness: A History of Tennessee State University'' (Mercer University Press, 2012) 340 pp.

External links

 

 
Historically black universities and colleges in the United States
Land-grant universities and colleges
Universities and colleges in Nashville, Tennessee
Educational institutions established in 1912
University and college buildings on the National Register of Historic Places in Tennessee
Universities and colleges accredited by the Southern Association of Colleges and Schools
1912 establishments in Tennessee
Historic districts on the National Register of Historic Places in Tennessee
National Register of Historic Places in Nashville, Tennessee
African-American history in Nashville, Tennessee
Public universities and colleges in Tennessee